The Abasyn University is a private university located in Peshawar, Khyber-Pakhtunkhwa, Pakistan. It was founded in 2007.

Overview
Abasyn university is chartered by the Government of Khyber Pakhtunkhwa and recognized by the Higher Education Commission (Pakistan) (HEC). It is also accredited by the Pharmacy Council of Pakistan and Pakistan Engineering Council. It offers undergraduate and post-graduate studies in various disciplines including engineering, engineering technology, computer science, business administration, pharmacy, microbiology, and education. Abasyn university is noted for its engaging research in the development of augmented reality and artificial intelligence.

Sub campuses
Besides its main campus in Peshawar, the university also has a teaching campus in Islamabad and in Ras Al Khaimah, UAE.

Journal 
Abasyn Journal of Social Sciences (AJSS) publishes rigorous, well written articles from a range of theoretical and methodological traditions. AJSS published articles that engage with contemporary challenges in the field of business and management.

References

External links
 Official website

Educational institutions established in 2007
2007 establishments in Pakistan
Private universities and colleges in Khyber Pakhtunkhwa
Universities and colleges in Peshawar
Islamabad
Engineering universities and colleges in Pakistan